Katukinan (Catuquinan) is a language family consisting of two languages in Brazil, Katukina-Kanamarí and the perhaps moribund Katawixi.  It is often not clear which names in the literature, which are generally tribal names and often correspond to dialects, refer to distinct languages. Indeed, they're close enough that some consider them all to be dialects of a single language, Kanamari (Fabre 2005).

Campbell (2012) note that Adelaar "presents reasonably persuasive evidence that Harákmbut and Katukinan are genetically related."

Language contact
Jolkesky (2016) notes that there are lexical similarities with the Jivaro, Máku, Mura-Matanawi, Puinave-Nadahup, Taruma, Tupi, Yanomami, and Arawak language families due to contact. This suggests that Katukinan and the language families with which it was in contact with had been earlier spoken within a central Amazon interaction sphere.

Languages and dialects
Many ethnic Katukina had shifted to other languages by the time of European contact. Examples are Panoan Katukina and unclassified Katukinaru.

The common suffix dyapa, djapa means 'tribe' or 'clan', for which the varieties are named. Fabre (2005) lists Kanamarí, Txuhuã-djapá, Katukína do Jutaí (Katukina proper), and Katawixi as four attested languages.

Loukotka (1968)
A large number of Katukinan dialects have gone extinct. Loukotka (1968) illustrates data from Catuquina (Wiri-dyapá, of the Jutaí River), Canamari, Parawa (Hon-dyapa), Bendiapa, and Catauxi (Catosé, Hewadie, Katawishi, Quatausi).  Canamari, Parawa, and Bendiapa (Beñ-Dyapá) may constitute a single language, as may Tucundiapa (Mangeroma, Tucano Dyapa).  He also notes a Tawari (Tauaré, Kadekili-dyapa, Kayarára), and a Buruá (Burue, Buruhe), of which nothing has been recorded. All of them are classified as "Southern Catuquina" except for Catauxi, which is the only "Northern Catuquina" language. The locations of each variety given by Loukotka (1968) are:

Catuquina / Wiri-dyapá - spoken on the Jutaí River
Canamari - Juruá River
Parawa / Hon-dyapá - Grégorio River near Santo Amaro
Tucundiapa / Mangeroma - Itecoaí River (Itaquai River)
Bendiapa - São José River
Tawari / Kadekili-dyapá / Kayarára - spoken north of the Bendiapa tribe
Buruá - spoken on the Biá River and Jutaí River
Catauxi - Madeira River and Purus River

Mason (1950)
Mason (1950) gives Pidá-Dyapá and Kutiá-Dyapá as dialects of Catukina, and Cadekili-Dyapá and Wadyo-Paraniñ-Dyapá (Kairara) as dialects of Tawari, corresponding to Loukotka's names Kadekili-dyapa and Kayarára. He adds Catukino and a "miscellaneous" list of Amena-Dyapá, Cana-Dyapá, Hon-Dyapá (which Loukotka identifies with Parawa), Marö-Dyapá, Ururu-Dyapá, and Wiri-Dyapá (which Loukotka identifies with Catuquina). Mason's (1950) internal classification of Catukina is summarized as follows.

Catukina
Beñ-Dyapá (Bendiapa)
Burue (Buruhe)
Canamari
Catawishi (Hewadie)
Catukina
Pidá-Dyapá
Kutiá-Dyapá
Catukino
Parawa
Tawari (Tauaré)
Cadekili-Dyapá
Wadyo-Paraniñ-Dyapá (Kairara)
Tucun-Dyapá (Tucano Dyapa, Mangeroma)
(miscellaneous)
Amena-Dyapá
Cana-Dyapá
Hon-Dyapá
Marö-Dyapá
Ururu-Dyapá
Wiri-Dyapá

Vocabulary
Loukotka (1968) lists the following basic vocabulary items for the Catuquinan languages.

{| class="wikitable sortable"
! gloss !! Catuquina !! Canamari !! Parawa !! Bendiapa !! Catauxi
|-
! one
| kexüktü || ekek || ikek || kik || wakata
|-
! two
| upaúa || ubawa || bawa || ubawa || sahe
|-
! three
| tupaua || ekek atehu || ikekʔtʔhu || kik atehu || tiumpa
|-
! head
| ghü || tyu-ki || chu-ke || chu-kii || tu-kãe
|-
! eye
| üghó || tyu-ekó || chu-iku || chu-iku || erada
|-
! tooth
| ü || tyu-hé || chu-he || chu-hi || hí-i
|-
! water
| uatahi || otahe || wataxi || waxi || mãnghi
|-
! moon
| vahliá || wádya || wadia || wadya || kuéyi
|-
! tree
| oma || umang || uma || umank || híhi
|-
! snake
| hüxpang || ipa ||  || ixpan || pagʔ
|-
! axe
| suhe || chuwe || yuhi || chui || toñhi
|}

See also
Macro-Puinavean

Bibliography
dos Anjos, Z. (2011). Fonologia e Gramática Katukina-Kanamari. Amsterdam: Vrije Universiteit Amsterdam. (Doctoral dissertation).
Groth, Ch. (1977). Here and There in Canamarí. Anthropological Linguistics, 19:203- 215.
Ssila, M. et al. (1989). Elementos da fonologia Kanamari. Cadernos de Estudos Lingüísticos, 16:123-141.
Tastevin, C. (n.d.). Dialecte katawixy. (Manuscript).
Tastevin, C. (n.d.). Langue canamari. (Manuscript).

References

Alain Fabre, 2005, Diccionario etnolingüístico y guía bibliográfica de los pueblos indígenas sudamericanos: "KATUKINA"

 
Languages of Brazil
Language families
Macro-Puinavean languages